Parliamentary elections were held in Belarus on 14 May 1995 to elect the thirteenth Supreme Council. The elections took place alongside a multi-question referendum, although several further rounds of voting were required on 28 May, 29 November and 10 December. The majority of candidates elected were independents, although 62 seats remained unfilled due to insufficient voter turnout. A total of 2,348 candidates and 22 parties contested the election, around a thousand of which were independents. After the planned two rounds, only 119 of the 260 seats had been filled due to turnouts being too low in some areas.  As this was well short of the 174 needed for a quorum, an additional two rounds were necessary. By the fourth round a quorum was reached, and although further rounds of voting were planned for 1996 to fill the remaining seats, following the constitutional amendments made following the referendum and the subsequent formation of a new National Assembly, they were not held.

Foreign observers noted that the elections were not free and fair.

Results

Aftermath
Following the elections, the MPs from the Belarusian Socialist Party, the Belarusian Labour Party and the Civic Party joined the United Civic Party of Belarus, together with one MP who defected from the Belarusian Party of Communists.

References

External links
 Report on parliamentary elections in Belarus - 14 and 28 may 1995

Belarus
Parliament
13th Belarusian Supreme Council
Parliamentary elections in Belarus